"Higher & Higher" is a 2000 song recorded by Dutch DJ, remixer and producer DJ Jurgen (a.k.a. Jürgen Rijkers). It was released as single only and features vocals by singer Karen Shenaz (a.k.a. Karen David). The track was a huge hit in the Netherlands, where it peaked at number five. Additionally, it also peaked at number 18 in Belgium, number 63 in Germany and number 86 in Switzerland. Outside Europe, the song reached number 34 on the Billboard Dance Club Songs chart in the US. The accompanying music video shows the singer performing in an elevator going up and down, while she watches different people entering and/or leaving.

Track listing

Charts

Weekly charts

Year-end charts

References

 

2000 singles
2000 songs
AM PM Records singles
English-language Dutch songs
Eurodance songs
House music songs
Trance songs